Rana Naidu is a 2023 Indian Hindi language action crime drama streaming television series on Netflix created and directed by Karan Anshuman and Suparn Verma. Produced by Sunder Aaron under the banner Locomotive Global Inc., it is the official adaptation of the 2013 crime TV series, Ray Donovan. It stars Venkatesh Daggubati, Rana Daggubati, Suchitra Pillai, Gaurav Chopra and Surveen Chawla in lead roles. The series released on 10 March 2023, via Netflix.

Premise 
Rana Naidu, who makes a living by fixing the messes left behind by his famous clients. He is known as the "fixer of the stars," and he takes his work very seriously. Rana struggles at home and his connection with his wife and two children is irreparably damaged, despite the fact that he is skilled at fixing problems and assisting people in leading tension-free lives. The situation is made worse by the fact that his estranged father Naga Naidu is released from prison after serving 15 years for a crime he never committed. Naga wants to mend his broken relationship with Rana and his other two sons in order to become the father he failed to be when he had the chance as he gears up for vengeance.

Cast

Production

Development 
The series was officially announced on 21 September 2021 by Netflix media press release.

Filming 
Principal photography commenced from October 2021. The series was officially wrapped up shooting in May 2022.

Marketing 
In September 2021, a short clip from the series was released from the Netflix Tudum event. The official teaser of the series was released in September 2022. The official trailer for the series released on February 15, 2023.

Release 
The series is streaming on Netflix from March 10, 2023, in both Hindi and Telugu languages.

Reception 
Sangeetha Devi Dundoo for The Hindu wrote "Beneath all that dressing up of sex, alcohol and expletives, Rana Naidu has an undercurrent of pathos. Cinematographer Jayakrishna Gummadi uses warm and dark tones to accentuate the grim atmosphere, aided by John Stewart Eduri’s background score."

Raghu Bandi for The Indian Express wrote "The overall story-broken family working hard to come together-actually suits Indian sensibilities. But the way it is treated is not to everyone’s taste."

Saibal Chatterjee for NDTV rated 2.5 stars out of 5 and wrote "As a series of ten episodes of an average of 50 minutes each, it had the potential for significant tonal variations. A lot of it remains unrealised because the show never quite breaks into a canter. Parts of Rana Naidu are monotonous."

Deepa Gahlot saw a mix of violence and sex in the series and wrote for Rediff.com in her review "Profane language is now par for the course for series about gangsters and a liberal sprinkling of cuss words do not even register anymore. But even so, the overuse of the 'G' word is simply annoying."

Vijayalakshmi Narayanan for The Free Press Journal rated the series 1 star out of 5 and wrote "With cusswords and sexually explicit scenes hitting you like a ton of bricks, you'd have to wonder how 'Rana Naidu' was approved for viewing despite 'College Romance', a relatively harmless show about youngsters, facing a legal notice from the Delhi High Court for 'obscene and vulgar' language."

Deep Haider of India Today rated the series 2.5 stars out of 5 and wrote "Rana Naidu could have been a welcome relief from the worldwide wokeness that has afflicted our creative spaces. It does not."

Udita Jhunjhunwala of Scroll.in wrote "It appears as though the creators directed Rana Daggubati to be one-note. If so, he’s aced it. He rarely smiles and barely gives his rage a break. In the moments when Rana Naidu quietly, but visibly, masks his judgement or extends a compassionate gesture, you feel a connection with him, but briefly."

Haricharan Pudipeddi for Hindustan Times wrote "Rana Naidu takes the whole family dynamics and gives it a sinister twist. Here’s a family that’s more flawed than one can even imagine."

Sanchita Jhunjhunwala of Zoom TV rated the series 4 stars out of 5 and wrote "A well written and directed series is one which has a balance of what it tells us it has to offer. As a crime drama, there's just enough crime going on and at the same time, there's also a lot of drama - be it the family, the kids, or the politics, among other things."

A reviewer of 123telugu.com wrote "The web shows allow the makers to produce content without any censorship restrictions, and when the adult content or foul language immerses nicely in the narrative, there won’t be a problem. But in Rana Naidu, the skin show and cuss words are used way more than the requirement, irritating the viewers."

See also 

 List of Netflix India Originals

References

External links 
 
 

Hindi-language Netflix original programming
Telugu-language Netflix original programming
Indian action television series
Indian crime drama television series
Indian television series distributed by Netflix
Indian television series based on American television series